The Nigerian Institute of Town Planners (NITP) is Nigeria's leading urban and regional planning body.  The institute exists to advance the art and science of planning for the interests of the country.

The institute was formed on September 5th 1966 by 30 pioneer town planners in Lagos.

Notable members
 Darius Ishaku

References

External links
NITP official website

1966 establishments in Nigeria
Nigerian urban planners